Maiko National Park is a national park in the Democratic Republic of the Congo. The park is divided into three sectors, straddling the states of Nord Kivu, Province Orientale and Maniema. Three of the country's spectacular endemic animals occur here: the Grauer's gorilla, the okapi, and the Congo peafowl. Maiko is also an important site for the conservation of the African forest elephant, eastern chimpanzee and the endemic aquatic genet.

Creation

In 1949, the Belgian colonial administration created the Bakumu Hunting Reserve (Bakumu, meaning "The Kumus", the native tribe in the region) on an area that would later encompass the boundaries of the Park as we know it today. The original plans for the area is believed to have aimed at preventing the exploitation of mineral resources rather the protection of the nature and the wildlife. On November 20 of 1970, the Presidential Decree no 70-312 which is bound to the law that had created the ICCN previous year, was signed into force by Joseph Désiré Mobutu. This document asserted the Maiko National Park to be a full-fledged nature protection area.

The rebel problem 

The roadless and inaccessible nature of the region made it ideal for some Simba rebels to retreat after their defeat in 1964. Ever since, they have been making a meager living by poaching on wildlife and controlling illegal mining activities inside of Maiko. The presence of the Simba also stems from the inability of the governing bodies to follow the compensatory measures required by the decree of 1970. This precarious security situation has made it difficult for the rangers to patrol the Park, especially after the ICCN was coerced by the Congolese army into guiding their attacks towards the Simba. Moreover, conservation work has also been hampered by the presence of rebels, culminating in capture and detainment of several survey crews between 2003 and 2005. At least three other rebels groups are known to be active in different parts of the park, among which the Rwandan Interahamwe in the east. Put together, these menaces leave absolutely no control over the park area by the ICCN.

International conservation efforts 

The first thorough exploration of the Maiko dates back to 1989, when the Wildlife Conservation Society, backed by the ICCN (then ZICN) and supported by the World Bank, the European Community and the WWF, moved into the area and surveyed about 950 km of transect. WCS further surveyed the North Sector in 2005. The Dian Fossey Gorilla fund conducted the first surveys of the southern sector of the park for over a decade in 2005,  and documented a gorilla population more widespread than previously detected from previous studies.

WCS surveyed an additional block in the  South Sector in 2006. These surveys, combined revealed that Maiko is highly threatened yet supports an important reservoir of endemic and rare species.

A more recent survey focussed on the forests west and south of the park in 2010  revealed that threats had intensified since 2005 and also documented the extinction of one of the new gorilla subpopulations documented in the 2005 surveys. All observations point out to the intense hunting pressure caused by miners and the widespread use of guns as serious threats to the remaining animal populations.

A new approach to conservation has been the implementation of compensation measures for Simbas willing to leave the Park. In 2010, FFI initiated the construction of health centers and schools in villages falling inside the zone of influence of the Simbas. The same year FZS launched an ambitious project aiming at turning the Simbas problem around by recruiting some of them as park rangers and allowing a de facto social reintegration which would directly benefit nature conservation in Maiko.

References

External links
 Protected Planet
 Fauna Flora International
 Dian Fossey Gorilla Fund International
 Frankfurt Zoological Society
 Jane Goodall Institute
 Conservation International

National parks of the Democratic Republic of the Congo
Protected areas established in 1970
1970 establishments in Africa
Northeastern Congolian lowland forests